Do the Bossa Nova with Herbie Mann (subtitled Recorded in Rio de Janeiro with the Greatest Bossa Nova Players) is an album by American jazz flautist Herbie Mann recorded in 1962 for the Atlantic label.

Reception

AllMusic awarded the album 4 stars with its review by Scott Yanow stating "Rather than play a watered-down version of bossa nova in New York studios (which was becoming quite common as the bossa nova fad hit its peak in 1962), flutist Herbie Mann went down to Brazil and recorded with some of the top players of the style. ...the music is as much Brazilian as it is jazz. This 'fusion' works quite well".

Track listing
 "Deve Ser Amor (It Must Be Love)" (Vinícius de Moraes, Baden Powell) – 4:19
 "Menina Feia (Ugly Girl)" (Oscar Castro-Neves) – 5:30
 "Amor Em Paz (Love in Peace)" (Antônio Carlos Jobim, de Moraes) – 2:36
 "Voce e Eu" (Carlos Lyra, de Moraes) – 4:21 
 "One Note Samba" (Antônio Carlos Jobim, Newton Mendonça) – 3:30
 "The Blues Walk" (Clifford Brown) – 4:06
 "Consolação (Consolation)" (Powell, de Moraes) – 4:26
 "Bossa Velha (Old Bossa)" (Herbie Mann) – 4:23

Personnel 
Herbie Mann – flute
Durval Ferreira (tracks 2 & 6), Baden Powell (tracks 1 & 7) – guitar 
Pedro Paulo – trumpet (tracks 2 & 6)
 Paulo Moura – alto saxophone (tracks 2 & 6)
Antônio Carlos Jobim – piano, vocals, arranger (tracks 3 & 5)
Luis Carlos Vinhas (track 4), Sergio Mendes (tracks 2 & 6) – piano
Gabriel (tracks 1 & 7), Papao (track 1), Otavio Bailly Jr. (tracks 2 & 6) – bass
Juquinha (track 7), Dom Um Romão (tracks 2 & 6), – drums
Zezinho e Sua Escola de Samba – percussion (track 8)
Other unidentified musicians

References 

1963 albums
Herbie Mann albums
Albums produced by Nesuhi Ertegun
Atlantic Records albums